Jirkuyeh (also Romanized as Jīrkūyeh and Jir Kooyeh; also known as Dzhirkukh, Jīrkūyeh-ye Khoshkbījār, and Jūrkūyeh) is a village in Hajji Bekandeh-ye Koshk-e Bijar Rural District, Khoshk-e Bijar District, Rasht County, Gilan Province, Iran. At the 2006 census, its population was 1,215, in 359 families.

References 

Populated places in Rasht County